Edin Šaranović  (8 March 1976 — 22 August 2021) was a Bosnian footballer who played as a forward.

Club career
Šaranović has played for NK Kamen Ingrad, NK Slaven Belupo and NK Međimurje in the Croatian Prva HNL and FK Sarajevo in the Bosnian Premier League. He also had a spell with Pogoń Szczecin in the Polish Ekstraklasa, and with FC Sokol Saratov in Russia.

He played for NK Primorje in the Slovenian PrvaLiga before moving to NK Zadar.

After spells abroad, he returned to Bosnia and Herzegovina and went on to play for FK Olimpic Sarajevo, FK Sloboda Tuzla and NK Tešanjka before finishing his playing career in 2012.

International career
Šaranović made his debut for Bosnia and Herzegovina in an August 2001 friendly match against Malta and has earned a total of 2 caps, scoring no goals. His second and final international was a September 2001 World Cup qualification match against Israel.

Post-playing career
On 1 February 2016, Šaranović was named manager of NK TOŠK Tešanj. He became president of the club later that year with Igor Remetić succeeding him as manager.

Death
He died on 22 August 2021 after suffering a heart attack several days earlier.

References

External links
 
 

1976 births
2021 deaths
People from Tešanj
Association football forwards
Bosnia and Herzegovina footballers
Bosnia and Herzegovina international footballers
NK TOŠK Tešanj players
FK Sarajevo players
Pogoń Szczecin players
FC Sokol Saratov players
NK Kamen Ingrad players
NK Slaven Belupo players
NK Međimurje players
NK Primorje players
NK Zadar players
FK Olimpik players
First League of the Federation of Bosnia and Herzegovina players
Premier League of Bosnia and Herzegovina players
Ekstraklasa players
Croatian Football League players
Slovenian PrvaLiga players
Bosnia and Herzegovina football managers
NK TOŠK Tešanj managers
Bosnia and Herzegovina expatriate footballers
Expatriate footballers in Poland
Bosnia and Herzegovina expatriate sportspeople in Poland
Expatriate footballers in Croatia
Bosnia and Herzegovina expatriate sportspeople in Croatia
Expatriate footballers in Slovenia
Bosnia and Herzegovina expatriate sportspeople in Slovenia